In graph theory, a graceful labeling of a graph with  edges is a labeling of its vertices with some subset of the integers from 0 to  inclusive, such that no two vertices share a label, and each edge is uniquely identified by the absolute difference between its endpoints, such that this magnitude lies between 1 and  inclusive.  A graph which admits a graceful labeling is called a graceful graph.

The name "graceful labeling" is due to Solomon W. Golomb; this type of labeling was originally given the name β-labeling by Alexander Rosa in a 1967 paper on graph labelings.

A major conjecture in graph theory is the graceful tree conjecture or Ringel–Kotzig conjecture, named after Gerhard Ringel and Anton Kotzig, and sometimes abbreviated GTC. 
It hypothesizes that all trees are graceful. It is still an open conjecture, although a related but weaker conjecture known as "Ringel's conjecture" was partially proven in 2020. 
 
Kotzig once called the effort to prove the conjecture a "disease".

Another weaker version of graceful labelling is near-graceful labeling, in which the vertices can be labeled using some subset of the integers on  such that no two vertices share a label, and each edge is uniquely identified by the absolute difference between its endpoints (this magnitude lies on ).

Another conjecture in graph theory is Rosa's Conjecture, named after Alexander Rosa, which says that all triangular cacti are graceful or nearly-graceful.

This conjecture has been verified for all graphs with 213 or fewer edges.

Selected results
In his original paper, Rosa proved that an Eulerian graph with number of edges m ≡ 1 (mod 4) or m ≡ 2 (mod 4) cannot be graceful.
Also in his original paper, Rosa proved that the cycle Cn is graceful if and only if n ≡ 0 (mod 4) or n ≡ 3 (mod 4).
All path graphs and caterpillar graphs are graceful.
All lobster graphs with a perfect matching are graceful.
All trees with at most 27 vertices are graceful; this result was shown by Aldred and McKay in 1998 using a computer program. This was extended to trees with at most 29 vertices in the Honours thesis of Michael Horton. Another extension of this result up to trees with 35 vertices was claimed in 2010 by the Graceful Tree Verification Project, a distributed computing project led by Wenjie Fang.
All wheel graphs, web graphs, helm graphs, gear graphs, and rectangular grids are graceful.
All n-dimensional hypercubes are graceful.
All simple graphs with four or fewer vertices are graceful. The only non-graceful simple graphs with five vertices are the 5-cycle (pentagon); the complete graph K5; and the butterfly graph.

See also
Edge-graceful labeling
List of conjectures

References

External links 

 Numberphile video about graceful tree conjecture

Further reading
 (K. Eshghi)  Introduction to Graceful Graphs, Sharif University of Technology, 2002.
 (U. N. Deshmukh and Vasanti N. Bhat-Nayak), New families of graceful banana trees – Proceedings Mathematical Sciences, 1996 – Springer
 (M. Haviar, M. Ivaska), Vertex Labellings of Simple Graphs, Research and Exposition in Mathematics, Volume 34, 2015.
 (Ping Zhang), A Kaleidoscopic View of Graph Colorings, SpringerBriefs in Mathematics, 2016 – Springer

Graph theory objects
Conjectures